a.k.a. In the realm of pink cinema, Japanese critics have estimated that Mukai is "the only serious rival of Kōji Wakamatsu." As a producer, Mukai helped the early careers of many prominent directors, including Hisayasu Satō and Academy-Award winner Yōjirō Takita. In his career, he directed nearly 200 films and produced approximately 500.

Life and career

Early career and 1960s
Kan Mukai was born in Dairen, Manchukuo (modern Dalian, China) on October 16, 1937. He studied economics at Kyushu University, but dropped out to pursue a career in film. In 1959 he began his apprenticeship, serving as assistant director to Kiyoshi Saeki, Tadashi Imai and Isao Yoshida. He also worked as a cinematographer on projects for various studios, mostly for educational, children's and industrial films. During this early period in his career he honed his craft and became known as a top cinematographer.

Wanting to direct, but lacking the educational requirements necessary to be hired as a director at a major studio, in 1965, Mukai moved into the lucrative new pink film genre. That year he founded Mukai Productions and, with financial backing from Nihon Cinema, directed his first pink feature, which was distributed by Kokuei. Though the film was a plotless series of scenes in the life of a prostitute, Mukai's technical skill impressed early pink audiences and critics, and he quickly became a major name in the genre. Comparing him to the major pink director of the 1960s, a critic for Kinema Junpo wrote, "Hiroshi Mukai is the only genre director who could rival Kōji Wakamatsu." Flesh received international distribution, and was released in Germany on May 14, 1965 as Nacktes Fleisch. The Bite (1966) was another early Mukai film shown overseas, playing in the U.S. soon after its Japanese release, and in Britain, under the title Bait, in 1967. It was released on DVD in the U.S. in 2008.

According to some sources, Mukai's Sexy Partners (1967) was the first S&M film. It was the first to use the subject as its primary theme. He worked with his wife, actress Takako Uchida, in several of his early films such as Nightly Pleasure (Yoru No Yorokobi, 1967), Stories of Adultery (Aru Mittsu, 1967), and Spring of Ecstasy (Kokotsu No Izumi, 1968). Stories of Adultery was a three-part omnibus film, with other two segments directed by Kōji Wakamatsu and Shin'ya Yamamoto (director). Mukai's section was titled Beauty and Ugliness (Bi To Shu). Takako Uchida later starred in Nikkatsu's big-budget pre-Roman Porno venture into the pink arena, Story Of Heresy In Meiji Era (1968). Mukai gave future first Nikkatsu Roman Porno star, Kazuko Shirakawa, her film debut with the 1967 film Girls' Dormitory. Until that studio's reorganization in 1967, Mukai's films were released principally through Kanto Films.

Mukai often employed gimmick-like elements in his films or their publicity to create audiences for his films. His Blue Film: Estimation (1968) benefitted from a publicity campaign emphasizing that mainstream actress Mitsugu Fujii was starring in this pink film. The whisper-campaign behind Flesh 2 (1969)—sequel to Mukai's debut film—focused on a sex scene between a Korean girl and a black U.S. G.I., and Japan Virgin Rape (1970) had the first lady of Indonesia in its cast. Blue Film Woman was an early all-color pink film, and Jasper Sharp writes that Mukai's use of color in this film appears to be "making up for lost time", and that the film is a "highly stylised piece." In 1969, Mukai's film  (1966) was released in Italy under the title Naomi. The film was banned due to obscenity, but scored a triumph in a showing at Waseda University's Okuma Auditorium.

1970s and later
Throughout his career Mukai was known for working in both action and sex genres, and in the 1970s, Mukai made several films in both genres, and with the two genres mixed for the Toei Company. Deep Throat in Tokyo, directed for Toei in 1975, is his best-known film. Comparing Mukai's film to the original Deep Throat (U.S., 1972), Jasper Sharp writes that Mukai's film, a softcore, "airbrushed fantasy" with a higher budget and, in Kumi Taguchi, a more attractive leading lady, is "a world apart from the more crude and direct approach taken by its revolutionary American model." Nevertheless, Sharp judges that Mukai's softcore film is more offensive than the hardcore original because of its more reactionary approach to sex.

In 1979, after the closing of his original Mukai Productions, Mukai started . The name "Shishi", meaning "Lion", was a pun on "4x4", indicating Mukai's ambition to foster the careers of 16 young directors. As producer, Mukai had an influence on the careers of the  group of directors who came to prominence in the 1980s. He continued working with Mukai throughout the decade. Takahisa Zeze also gained his first film experience at Shishi, working as a screenwriter, and assistant directing for Satō. Through Shishi Productions Mukai gave Academy-Award-winning director Yōjirō Takita his first work in the film industry.

In June 1982 Mukai re-formed Mukai Productions. As a production company, Mukai's films were distributed by other studios, including Nikkatsu, which used these films to supplement their Roman porno series triple-bills. During the 1980s, when rape-themed films were popular, Mukai produced some of Nikkatsu's most extreme examples of the genre, including the Subway Serial Rape series (1985–1988). Mukai produced celebrated Roman porno director Tatsumi Kumashiro's final film,  (1995).

In his later works as director Mukai moved into non-pink mainstream subjects. His Going West (1997) was what the director called, "Japan's first granny road movie". He directed a sequel to Going West entitled Hometown in 1999. Other films of this final, mainstream period in Mukai's career include Last Dance (2001) and School Reunion (2004). After battling liver cancer for two years, Mukai died on June 11, 2008.

Partial filmography

Bibliography

English

Japanese

External links
 Mukai Productions homepage

Notes

1937 births
2008 deaths
Deaths from liver cancer
Deaths from cancer in Japan
Japanese film directors
Pink film directors
Japanese people from Manchukuo
Kyushu University alumni
20th-century Japanese screenwriters